A victory parade is a parade held to celebrate a victory. Numerous military and sport victory parades have been held.

Military victory parades 

Among the most famous parades are the victory parades celebrating the end of the First World War and the Second World War. However, victory parades date back to ancient Rome, where Roman triumphs celebrated a leader who was militarily victorious. In the modern age, victory parades typically take the form of celebrating a national victory, rather than a personal one. In the 21st century, politicians in nations such as Ukraine and Azerbaijan have stated their intentions to hold victory parades after the resolving of regional conflicts, in this case the Nagorno-Karabakh conflict and the War in Donbass respectively.

Joint-parades 
Berlin Victory Parade of 1945 - USSR, USA, Great Britain and France
Berlin Victory Parade of 1946 - USSR, USA, Great Britain and France
German–Soviet military parade in Brest-Litovsk - Germany and USSR

Azerbaijan 
 1918 Baku Victory Parade, celebrating the victory in the Battle of Baku by Ottoman forces and forces of the Azerbaijan Democratic Republic from the Bolsheviks.
 2020 Baku Victory Parade

China 

 2015 China Victory Day Parade, September 3, 2015, a military parade to celebrate the 70th anniversary of Victory over Japan Day of the Second World War.

Estonia 
 Võidupüha (June 23), celebrates the victory in the Battle of Võnnu (1919)

Finland 

Valkoisten Voitonparaati
1941 Viipuri Victory Parade

France 

 1871 Prussian Parade in Paris, celebrating the Franco-Prussian War.
1919 Paris Victory Parade, celebrating the victory in the First World War.
1940 German Victory Parade in Paris. After the Fall of France, the German army marched down the Champs-Élysées in Triumph on 14 June 1940.
 1944 Paris Victory Parade, held on 26 August 1944.
1944 Dieppe Victory Parade, Victory Parade of the 2nd Canadian Infantry Division in Dieppe celebrated on 3 September 1944.
 1945 Paris Victory Parade

Germany 

 1945 British Berlin Victory Parade

Mongolia 

 80th Anniversary Battle of Khalkhin Gol Victory Parade (2020)

Iraq 

 Baghdad Victory Parade of 2017, celebrating the end of the War in Iraq, held in the fortified Green Zone.

Poland 

 Wehrmacht victory parade in Warsaw in honor of the Invasion of Poland, 5 October 1939.

Russia and the former Soviet Union

Parades such as the following are traditionally held on 9 May to celebrate the victory in World War II over Nazi Germany:

Moscow Victory Parade of 1945
1945 Harbin Victory Day Parade
Parade of Guards in Leningrad 
Partisans Parade
Red Army Parade at the Brandenburg Gate on 4 May 1945
Moscow Victory Day Parade
In some countries of the former USSR, primarily the Russian Federation, victory parades are held annually in every major city celebrating the victory of the Soviet Union in the Great Patriotic War (1941–1945). Other victory parades honor the following:
 Abkhazian Independence Day Parade
 1945 May 1 Parade, held on International Workers Day and dubbed by the local media as a "Victory Parade" due to the victory over Nazi Germany that was anticipated (it would come 9 days later).

Serbia and the former Yugoslavia 

 March of the Victor in Belgrade
 Liberation Parade in Skopje, Macedonia
 Operation Storm Victory Parade

Spain 
 1939 Madrid Victory Parade, held on 19 May 1939 to celebrate the Nationalist victory in the Spanish Civil War (1936-1939).

Turkey 
 Victory Parade in honor of the Battle of Dumlupınar

Ukraine
 Kiev Victory Parade (1920)
 Kyiv Independence Day Parade (24 August)

United Kingdom 
 1815 London Victory Parade, celebrating the victory in the Napoleonic Wars.
 1919 London Victory Parade, celebrating the victory in the First World War.
 1946 London Victory Parade, celebrating the victory in the Second World War.
 1982 London Victory Parade, celebrating the victory in the Falklands War.
 1945 British Hong Kong Parade, it was held on 9 October 1945 near the local Cenotaph and celebrated the reclamation of Hong Kong from Japanese rule.

United States 

 Grand Review of the Armies
 New York City Victory Parade of 1946, January 12, designated by the United States Department of War to head the G.I. Victory Parade up Fifth Avenue. The 8,800 men of the 82nd Airborne after docking in N.Y.C. harbour, aboard the Queen Mary the division was greeted by Mayor William O'Dwyer. This event was filmed by Pathe News.
 National Victory Celebration

Vietnam 
Hanoi Victory Parade - It was held on 1 January 1955 during the Vietnam War. Vietnamese leader Ho Chi Minh announced a government policy to restore the economy of North Vietnam. A Soviet film called Vietnam was released featuring the parade.

Sports victory parades

United Kingdom sports victories 
 Our Greatest Team Parade - celebrating Britain's successful 2012 Olympic and Paralympic teams
 There is an annual victory parade to celebrate the winner of football's Premier League, held in the winner's home city, although 2016-17 champions Chelsea , 2019-20 champions Liverpool, and 2020-21 champions Manchester City did not hold it. The most recent was held in Manchester for the 2021-22 champions Manchester City on 23 May 2022. Similar events may also apply to teams who achieved promotion or won other trophies. The most recent was held in Liverpool for Liverpool F.C., winners of the 2021-22 EFL Cup and 2021-22 FA Cup, and Liverpool F.C. Women, winners of the 2021-22 FA Women's Championship on 29 May 2022.

United States and Canada sports victories 

Cities hosting the winning team in one of the four major professional sports leagues, plus Major League Soccer, will host a victory parade in the city that the team represents.

 MLB - World Series champions
 The most recent was the 2022 Houston Astros Victory Parade in Houston, Texas on November 7, 2022.
 NFL - Super Bowl champions
 The most recent was the 2023 Kansas City Chiefs Victory Parade in Kansas City, Missouri on February 15, 2023.
 NHL - Stanley Cup champions
 The most recent was the 2022 Colorado Avalanche Victory Parade in Denver, Colorado on June 30, 2022.
 NBA - NBA champions
 The most recent was the 2021 Milwaukee Bucks Victory Parade in Milwaukee, Wisconsin on July 22, 2021.
MLS - MLS Cup champions
 The most recent was the 2022 Los Angeles FC Victory Parade and Celebrations in Los Angeles on November 6, 2022.

In addition victory parades are held on campuses of major colleges and universities to celebrate NCAA championships in football, baseball and basketball. With the creation of the Celebration Bowl in the fall of 2016, the top Football Championship Subdivision historically black college or university that has, thru this bowl game, won the Black college football national championship, is thus eligible to host such a parade on that college or university's home town or city following the Celebration Bowl championship victory.

 Black college football champions - NCAA FCS Division 1
 The most recent was the 2022 North Carolina Central Eagles football team parade and celebrations in Durham, North Carolina on January 21, 2023. This parade is considered the very first one of its kind ever held in the Celebration Bowl era of NCAA FCS D1 HBCU football history.

See also 
 Roman triumph
 Victory Day

References

External links 
 

Aftermath of war
Military parades